Ghulakandoz is a village and a jamoat in north-western Tajikistan. It is located in Jabbor Rasulov District in Sughd Region. The jamoat has a total population of 39,006 (2015).

References

Populated places in Sughd Region